Belliella baltica  is a Gram-negative and rod-shaped bacterium from the genus of Belliella which has been isolated from water from the Baltic Sea.

References

External links
Type strain of Belliella baltica at BacDive -  the Bacterial Diversity Metadatabase	

Cytophagia
Bacteria described in 2004